Naviego is one of 54 parish councils in Cangas del Narcea, a municipality within the province and autonomous community of Asturias, in northern Spain. 

Villages
 Folgueiraxú
 La Mata
 Murias de Puntarás
 Naviegu
 Palaciu
 Peneḷḷada
 Puntarás
 La Riela Naviegu
 Viḷḷacaness
 Viḷḷaxu
 Viḷḷar de Naviegu

References

Parishes in Cangas del Narcea